is a Japanese chef famous for cooking Chinese cuisine.

Biography
Wakiya was born in Sapporo, Hokkaidō. He began his career as a chef in 1973, at the age of 15, when he got a job in a Chinese restaurant in Ōsaka; he opened his own restaurant, Turandot, in the Yokohama branch of the Pan Pacific Hotel in 1995. He appeared on Fuji Television's Iron Chef two times during its original broadcast run, losing to Iron Chef French Hiroyuki Sakai in the Sea Urchin battle in 1994, before winning in 1997 against Iron Chef Chinese Chen Kenichi with Papaya as the theme. and was named Iron Chef Chinese for the 2012 revival of the series. He opened a restaurant in New York City's Gramercy Park Hotel in July 2007, garnering a mixed review from the New York Times. Now Chef at KOA Restaurant, 12 West Twenty First Street, New York.

Publications

References

External links
Personal homepage
Turandot official homepage
KOA Restaurant - New York City

1958 births
Living people
Japanese chefs
People from Sapporo